São Vicente is a municipality along the north-west coast of the island of Madeira.

History
The first human visitors to São Vicente appeared in the middle of the 15th century, colonizing the area much later than the settlers in the southern part of the island, owing to its fertility. This area of the island, due to its steep escarpments and deep river-valleys made early settlement difficult. The first settlers appeared in the areas of São Vicente and Ponta Delgada, respectively.

The progressive growth of its population led to dis-annexation of São Vicente from the Captaincy of Machico, and elevation to municipal seat by royal charter on 23 August 1774. At that time the parishes of Porto Moniz, Seixal, Arco de São Jorge and São Jorge where under the administration of the municipal authority.

In 1835, the restructuring of municipal government under the Liberal reformer Mouzinho da Silveira lead to the creation of two new municipalities (Santana and Porto Moniz) along the northern coast of Madeira, which reduced the area of São Vicente. But, by 1867, under decree it reverted to its former dimensions. In 1898, with the re-establishment of the former municipalities São Vicente began to function within the current territorial area.

Legend
A legend exists that the toponymic name of the region, developed from an incident where Saint Vincent of Saragossa appeared in a rocky cove near the mouth of the river. Consequently, the settlers constructed a small chapel to the saint, owing to the great devotion to his personage.

Geography

São Vicente is located west of Santana and Machico and east of Porto Moniz, linked by roadway to Santana and the western part of the island. It is also home to the São Vicente Caves.

The municipality includes three civil parishes, that handle local government administration:
 Boaventura - physically the largest parish, but with the smallest population density, it is located in the northeast coast of the municipality, and ultimately the last to be settled;
 Ponta Delgada - a small parish, nestled between two promontories;
 São Vicente - the largest parish in population and density, home to the municipal seat; it had a population of 3,139 (in 2011) in an area of 44.14 km2

Climate

Notable citizens
 Gregório Joaquim Diniz (ca.1863 - 1931) - doctor, Sub-Delegate for Health, and involved in the first hydro-electrical production facility on the island of Madeira, at Pé de Corrida.

References
Notes

Sources

External links
Photos of São Vicente
Webportal of São Vicente, Santana and Porto Moniz, Local Radio

Towns in Portugal
Madeira Island
Municipalities of Madeira